Jahangirganj is a nagar panchayat and Market in Ambedkar Nagar district in the Indian state of Uttar Pradesh and is Subpost Office. It is found 45 km towards East from District headquarters Akbarpur, Ambedkar Nagar and 242 km from State capital Lucknow.

Demographics
As of 2011 Indian Census, Jahangirganj had a total population of 4,773, of which 2,406 were males and 2,367 were females. Population within the age group of 0 to 6 years was 636.

Road
Jahangirganj is a counted by National Highway 233A (India) is going Tanda To Rajesultanpur and Azamgarh.

Ecology 
The highest day temperature during the summer is in between 26 °C to 46 °C and average temperatures of January is 16 °C, February is 18 °C, March is 26 °C, April is 32 °C and May is 37 °C.

Nearly cities
 Tanda, Ambedkar Nagar 35 km
 Akbarpur 45 km
 Azamgarh 43 km
 Gorakhpur 70 km
 Khalilabad 47 km
 Rajesultanpur 20 km

References

Villages in Ambedkar Nagar district